William Haskell may refer to:
 William N. Haskell, United States Army general
 William T. Haskell, 19th century Tennessee politician
 William E. Haskell, American organ-builder and inventor 
 Will Haskell, member of the Connecticut State Senate